Vaibhav Tatwawadi (born 25 September 1988) is an Indian actor who appears in mainly Marathi movies, and also worked in Hindi movies.

Early life
Vaibhav was born in Amravati, Maharashtra, India to Sheela and Dr. Vivek Tatwawadi. His mother is a home maker and his father heads a local  Engineering College. He has a younger brother Gaurav Tatwawadi, who has done his MBA from MDI- Gurgaon. Vaibhav completed his schooling at Somalwar High School, Nagpur before moving to Pune in 2006 to pursue a degree in Metallurgical engineering at College of Engineering, Pune. He started experimenting with theatre while still at school and pursued it actively through his undergraduate years. His versatility and natural flair for acting brought him tremendous success and recognition in the local theatre circuit. He completed his education in 2010 and moved to Mumbai in 2011, to pursue a career in films.

Career
Tatwawadi basically started his career from couple of prestigious contests of Pune as theatre actor. Officially, he started his career with television and made his Marathi film debut in 2014 with Santosh Manjrekar's Surajya. The film did moderate business at the box office but Tatwawadi mature portrayal of a sensitive, young professional fighting for a social cause garnered critical acclaim. His first release in 2015 was the romantic feature Coffee Ani Barach Kahi alongside Prarthana Behere. The film emerged as a commercial and critical success and Tatwawadi's performance was widely appreciated. 

His second release in 2015 was the Hindi adult comedy Hunter which also marked his Bollywood debut. Tatwawadi essayed a powerful supporting role which earned him mention in Filmfare magazine. He closed the year with another strong supporting performance as Chimaji Appa, in Sanjay Leela Bhansali's Bajirao Mastani. Critics were unanimous in their praise with Rajeev Masand (CNN IBN) review and Taran Adarsh review. In 2016, Tatwawadi changed gears with his first action packed role in Mr. and Mrs. Sadachari.

Media image 

He was ranked thirty-first in The Times of India's Top 50 Most Desirable Men of India in 2017.

Filmography

Films

Television

Web series

References

External links
 
 

Marathi actors
1988 births
Living people
Indian male film actors
Male actors in Marathi television
People from Nagpur
Male actors from Nagpur